Goodenia mystrophylla is a perennial herb in the family Goodeniaceae, found in the states of Queensland and New South Wales, Australia. Often seen on moist sandy coastal soils, north of Narrabeen. Flowers may form in any month of the year. The specific epithet mystrophylla is derived from the Greek language, referring to the oblanceolate or "spoon shape" of the leaves.

References 

mystrophylla
Flora of Queensland
Flora of New South Wales
Plants described in 1810